The Louisiana road is a roadway in Croatia, built between 1803 and 1812 by an association of noble families (Lichtenstein, Dietrichstein, Esterházy, Harrach, Batthyány, Anna Maria Erdődy) and designed by Josef Philipp Vukassovich. The road was finished by the French Empire. It is named after Napoleon's second wife Marie Louise.

It linked Rijeka with Karlovac through Grobničko polje, Kamenjak, Gornje Jelenje, Lokve, Delnice, Skrad, Stubica, Severin na Kupi, and Netretić. The length of the Louisiana road was 18 Austrian miles (1 mile = 7.585 km). It was about 8 m wide (26 Wiener Fuß). It was the shortest route between Rijeka and Karlovac, and was one of the most modern roads in the empire. With the building of the Lujzijana, the Karolina road became less important.

References

Roads in Croatia